Chang Yaw-teing (born 28 March 1965) is a Taiwanese baseball player who competed in the 1992 Summer Olympics.

He was part of the Chinese Taipei baseball team which won the silver medal. He played as infielder.

External links
profile

1965 births
Living people
Baseball players at the 1992 Summer Olympics
Olympic baseball players of Taiwan
Baseball players from Tainan
Olympic silver medalists for Taiwan
Olympic medalists in baseball
Baseball players at the 1990 Asian Games
Medalists at the 1992 Summer Olympics
Asian Games competitors for Chinese Taipei